Walther Ludwig (17 March 1902 – 15 May 1981) was a German operatic lyric tenor, particularly associated with Mozart roles and Schubert lieder.

Biography
He was born on 17 March 1902 in Bad Oeynhausen.

He first studied medicine in Freiburg before turning to voice studies in Königsberg, where he made his debut in 1928. He then sang in Schwerin, where he created the title role in Paul Graeners's Friedmann Bach in 1931. He joined the Städtische Oper Berlin in 1932, where he established himself in Mozart roles such as Belmonte, Don Ottavio, Tamino, Idomeneo, Ferrando, etc. After the war, he began appearing at the Hamburg State Opera, and made his debut at the Vienna State Opera in 1947 and at the  Salzburg Festival in 1948.

He also made guest appearances at La Scala in Milan, the Paris Opéra, the Royal Opera House in London, the Liceo in Barcelona.

A stylish and musical lyric tenor, other notable roles included light Italian roles such as Nemorino, Ernesto, Duke of Mantua, Alfredo, French lyric role such as Wilhelm Meister. He left complete recordings of Die Entführung aus dem Serail, Die Zauberflöte, Die lustigen Weiber von Windsor, Zar und Zimmermann, Die schöne Müllerin, Die Schöpfung, and a very Germanic sounding Verdi Requiem. He was the very moving Evangelist in a live 1950 Vienna performance of Bach's Matthew Passion under Karajan, in which Kathleen Ferrier sang, now available on CD.

He taught in Berlin from 1952 until 1969. He died on 15 May 1981 in Lahr, Germany.

Selected filmography
 I by Day, You by Night (1932)
 Count Woronzeff (1934)
 Maria Ilona (1939)

References

Sources
Biography on Operissimo.com (in German)

1902 births
1981 deaths
German operatic tenors
20th-century German male opera singers
People from Bad Oeynhausen
Officers Crosses of the Order of Merit of the Federal Republic of Germany
Academic staff of the Hochschule für Musik Hanns Eisler Berlin